Oleksandra Kohut (born December 9, 1987) is a wrestler from Ukraine. She is now representing Austria.

External links
 bio on fila-wrestling.com

Living people
1987 births
Ukrainian female sport wrestlers
Austrian female sport wrestlers
World Wrestling Championships medalists
Universiade medalists in wrestling
Universiade bronze medalists for Ukraine
European Games competitors for Ukraine
Wrestlers at the 2015 European Games
European Wrestling Championships medalists
Medalists at the 2005 Summer Universiade
21st-century Ukrainian women